Michael Paul Stefanik (May 20, 1958 – September 15, 2019) was an American professional stock car racing driver. He competed mainly in the NASCAR Whelen Modified Tour, but also made appearances in the Busch Grand National series and the Craftsman Truck Series. A seven-time champion in the Modified series, Stefanik was named the second greatest NASCAR Modified driver of all-time in 2003. His nine total championships (two in the Busch North Series) tie him with Richie Evans for the most in NASCAR history. Stefanik is a member of the 2021 NASCAR Hall of Fame class.

Racing career

Whelen Modified Series 
Stefanik ran his first full Whelen Modified Tour season in 1987. He recorded his first championship in 1989, winning in seven of his 26 starts. He continued to be a major player in the 1990s, winning the 1991 series championship, finishing out of the top ten just once that season. After not running a complete schedule for a few years, Stefanik finished fifth in 1995 and won the 1997 and 1998 titles while simultaneously racing full-time and winning the championship those same years in the Busch North Series. Taking the 2000 season off to run full-time in the Camping World Truck Series, Stefanik won the championship his first two years back, not winning too many races but consistently placing in the top ten. Again pursuing other interests (this time K&N series), Stefanik did not contend in 2003, 2004, or 2005 but won the 2006 season opener, completed every lap that season and only was out of first place for one week, winning the championship. Steadily trending downward from there, Stefanik's first full winless season came in 2010. He won his last race at Bristol Motor Speedway in 2013, and started his last race in 2014.

In 2013, Stefanik competed in the inaugural UNOH Battle at the Beach at Daytona International Speedway. On the final lap, he was leading until contact with Steve Park sent him spinning; he finished 13th in the race. Afterwards, when Speed reporter Ray Dunlap arrived to interview him, Stefanik angrily stated he is "that freaking pissed. This is just bullshit." The interview was subsequently aired on The Jay Leno Show.

K&N Pro Series East 
Stefanik won in only his third start, which came in 1991. He ran his first full season in 1993 while racing Modifieds and won the 1997 and 1998 championships, pocketing over $100,000 for each season. In doing so, he became the first driver to win two NASCAR championships in consecutive years; Lee Petty is the only other person to have won two championships in one year. Stefanik raced full seasons in 2003, 2004 and 2005 while stepping away from Modifieds, but did not have the same amount of success.

Craftsman Truck Series 
Stefanik moved up to the Craftsman Truck Series, racing for Phelon Motorsports and finishing in the top ten nine times during 1999, achieving Rookie of the Year honors.

Halls of Fame 

Stefanik was elected to the New England Auto Racers Hall of Fame in his first year of eligibility. He was inducted Nov. 11, 2018 by writer Mark "Bones" Bourcier.
In 2013, Michael accepted his late brother Bob's induction.  Bob and Michael are the fifth pair of brothers enshrined in the NEAR Hall.

Stefanik was first nominated to the NASCAR Hall of Fame in 2015, and was elected to the Hall in 2022.

Death 

According to Connecticut State Police, on the afternoon of September 15, 2019, Stefanik took off in a friend's Aero-Works Aerolite 103 from Riconn Airport (Greene, Rhode Island), and was headed back when it experienced mechanical problems causing it to lose power and crash in a wooded area in Sterling, Connecticut. He was airlifted to Rhode Island Hospital, where he died from his injuries.

Motorsports career results

NASCAR 
(key) (Bold – Pole position awarded by qualifying time. Italics – Pole position earned by points standings or practice time. * – Most laps led. ** – All laps led.)

Busch Series 

 Competed only in companion events with Busch North Series as BNS driver and ineligible for Busch Series points

Craftsman Truck Series

Busch North Series

Whelen Modified Tour

References

External links 
 

1958 births
2019 deaths
Accidental deaths in Connecticut
Aviators killed in aviation accidents or incidents in the United States
NASCAR drivers
People from Wilbraham, Massachusetts
Racing drivers from Massachusetts
Victims of aviation accidents or incidents in 2019
NASCAR Hall of Fame inductees